Because We Are Girls is a Canadian documentary film, directed by Baljit Sangra and released in 2019. The film centres on Jeeti, Kira and Salakshana Pooni, three Punjabi Canadian sisters from Williams Lake, British Columbia who have gone public in adulthood about allegations of childhood sexual abuse by a cousin who frequently babysat them as children.

The film was slated to premiere at the 2018 Vancouver International Film Festival, but the screening was pulled from the festival as the sisters' court case against their cousin was still pending. It instead premiered at the 2019 Hot Docs Canadian International Documentary Festival, and had its first screening in British Columbia at the DOXA Documentary Film Festival.

The film received two nominations at the Vancouver Film Critics Circle Awards 2019, for Best Canadian Documentary and Best British Columbia Film.

References

External links

2019 films
Canadian documentary films
National Film Board of Canada documentaries
Films shot in British Columbia
2010s English-language films
2010s Canadian films